The albums discography of American jazz artist Sarah Vaughan contains 48 studio albums, ten live albums, 35 compilation albums, two extended plays, five box sets and eight album appearances. Her debut studio album was issued in 1950 and was followed by her second self-titled studio recording was released on EmArcy Records in 1954. The later was a collaborative effort with Clifford Brown. Vaughan's 1958 album titled Sarah Vaughan Sings George Gershwin later would chart in the top 50 of the Billboard Traditional Jazz Albums chart. In 1959, No Count Sarah (a collaborative release with the Count Basie Orchestra) reached the top 20 of the UK Albums Chart. Vaughan recorded three live records for Mercury Records during the 1950s, beginning with 1957's At Mister Kelly's.

In the 1960s, Vaughan recorded a series of albums for Roulette Records, beginning with 1960's ballad-focused Dreamy. She and the Count Basie Orchestra released a second studio album in 1961. The decade was further highlighted by further Roulette projects, such as the Sarah Slightly Classical (1963) and Sarah Sings Soulfully (1965). She later moved back to Mercury Records and released several albums beginning with the Latin-flavored ¡Viva! Vaughan. Her final album releases for Mercury were issued in 1967. Vaughan then recorded several albums for Mainstream Records between 1971 and 1974. This included 1973's Live in Japan. Additionally, an album with Michel Legrand reached the Billboard 200 chart during this time. Vaughan then recorded for Pablo Records and released several albums through 1982, ending with Crazy and Mixed Up. Her final studio effort was 1987's Brazilian Romance. In later years, her compilation albums would reach charting Billboard positions on the Jazz charts. This included Ken Burns Jazz (2000) and Sarah for Lovers (2003).

Studio albums

1950s

1960s

1970s

1980s

Compilation albums

1950s–1980s

1990s–2010s

Live albums

Box sets

Extended plays

Other album appearances

References

External links
 Sarah Vaughan Discography at Discogs
 The Sarah Vaughan Discography at Michael Minn

Discographies of American artists
Sarah Vaughan albums
Vocal jazz discographies